Trzyciąż  is a village in Olkusz County, Lesser Poland Voivodeship, in southern Poland. It is the seat of the gmina (administrative district) called Gmina Trzyciąż.

References

Villages in Olkusz County